Calumet is a station on Metra's Metra Electric Line located in East Hazel Crest, Illinois. The station is officially located at Park Avenue and 174th Street, near the Calumet Country Club, however the actual location is on Wood Street south of 174th Street. Park Avenue terminates at 171st Street. The station is on a solid-fill elevated structure and consists of one island platform which serves the Metra Electric Line's two tracks. There is no agent at Calumet, but tickets may be purchased from a vending machine in the waiting room.

References

External links

entrance from Google Maps Street View

Metra stations in Illinois
Former Illinois Central Railroad stations
Railway stations in Cook County, Illinois
Railway stations in the United States opened in 1856